"Jockey Full of Bourbon" is a song by Tom Waits released as the first single from his 1985 album Rain Dogs. It is featured in the films Down By Law (1986) and Things to Do in Denver When You're Dead (1995).

Personnel
 Tom Waits - guitar, vocals
 Stephen Arvizu Taylor Hodges - drums
 Larry Taylor - double bass
 Michael Blair - percussion, conga
 Marc Ribot - guitar
 Ralph Carney - bass sax

Cover versions
"Jockey Full of Bourbon" has been covered by performers including Joe Bonamassa (on his 2009 album The Ballad of John Henry), John P. Hammond, (on his 2001 album Wicked Grin), Moxy Früvous (on their album Live Noise), Moshav (on their album Misplaced), Los Lobos, Youn Sun Nah, Diana Krall, The Blue Hawaiians, Tim Timebomb, Miljoonasade, the Baltimore originated - progressive rock band "Octaves", and the greek country-blues-folk band Dead March on their 2017 debut album "Stolen Chants to Have a Chance".

References

External links
 Allmusic song review

Tom Waits songs
Songs written by Tom Waits
Songs about alcohol
1985 singles
1985 songs